Porphyromonas circumdentaria  is a Gram-negative and anaerobic bacterium from the genus of Porphyromonas which has been isolated from a subcutaneous abscess of a cat in Australia.

References 

Bacteroidia
Bacteria described in 1992